Martin Emmrich and Christopher Kas were the defending champions, but chose not to participate together.  Emmrich played alongside Lukáš Rosol, but lost to Daniele Bracciali and Andrey Golubev in the semifinals.  Kas teamed up with Philipp Kohlschreiber, but lost to Henri Kontinen and Jarkko Nieminen in the quarterfinals.
Kontinen and Nieminen won the title, defeating Bracciali and Golubev in the final, 6–1, 6–4.

Seeds

Draw

Draw

References
 Main Draw

Bet-at-home Cup Kitzbuhel - Doubles
2014 Doubles